The men's individual road race at the 1984 Summer Olympics in Los Angeles, California, was held on Sunday July 29, 1984. There were 135 participants from 43 nations in the race over 190.20 km, on a course in Mission Viejo, California. The maximum number of cyclists per nation was four. 55 cyclists finished. The event was won by Alexi Grewal of the United States, the nation's first medal in the men's individual road race. All three nations represented on the podium were there for the first time in the event; Canada with Steve Bauer's silver and Norway with Dag Otto Lauritzen's bronze joined the Americans.

Background
This was the 12th appearance of the event, previously held in 1896 and then at every Summer Olympics since 1936. It replaced the individual time trial event that had been held from 1912 to 1932 (and which would be reintroduced alongside the road race in 1996). The late 1970s and early 1980s had seen a shift in power in the sport from Western Europe to the world's superpowers, with Eastern Europe (particularly Poland) more generally also rising. With the Soviet-led boycott, the host Americans were favored. Davis Phinney was considered "the best sprinter on the US team" but "not a great climber"; the hilly course did not favor him. Alexi Grewal nearly missed being able to compete, testing positive for the stimulant phenylethylamine and being suspended 10 days before the Games; he successfully appealed and was reinstated, on the ground that the test was not able to distinguish between phenylethylamine and albuterol (which Grewal took for asthma).

Bermuda, Belize, the Cayman Islands, Cyprus, Puerto Rico, Saudi Arabia, and Uganda each made their debut in the men's individual road race. Great Britain made its 12th appearance in the event, the only nation to have competed in each appearance to date.

Competition format and course
The mass-start race was on a 190.2 kilometre course over 12 laps of a circuit in Mission Viejo. The course was hilly.

Schedule
All times are Pacific Daylight Time (UTC-7)

Results
Grewal and Bauer separated from the lead pack on lap 11. They "never had a large lead" over the next pair, Lauritzen and Sæther, but were always clear of them. Grewal beat Bauer in the final sprint by "less than a wheel."

References

External links
 Official Report

Road cycling at the 1984 Summer Olympics
Cycling at the Summer Olympics – Men's road race
Men's events at the 1984 Summer Olympics